The 2018 BWF International Series was the twelfth season of the BWF International Series.

Schedule 
Below is the schedule released by Badminton World Federation:

Results

Winners

Performance by nation

Players with multiple titles 
In alphabetical order.

References 

 
BWF International Series
BWF International Series